In contemporary usage, Mesmerize, mezmerize or mesmerise refers to the act of hypnosis.

Mesmerize may also refer to:
Animal magnetism, also known as mesmerism
"Mesmerize" (song), a 2003 single by rapper Ja Rule
Mezmerize (album), a 2005 album by System of a Down
Mesmerize (video game), a 2007 Interactive art game for the PlayStation 3

See also
 Hypnosis
 Mesmerized (disambiguation)